William Wadham may refer to:
 William Wadham (Australian politician), politician in the colony of South Australia
 Sir William Wadham (died 1452),  High Sheriff of Devon, 1441–1442 	
 William Joseph Wadham, English watercolour painter, active in Australia